Camp Hammond may refer to:

Camp Hammond (Yarmouth, Maine), listed on the National Register of Historic Places
Camp Hammond (comics)
Camp Hammond (Kansas)